Bakhshi Hayati (also Romanized as Bakhshī Ḩayāţī; also known as Bakhshī Ḩayāţī-ye Chūbar) is a village in Chubar Rural District, Haviq District, Talesh County, Gilan Province, Iran. At the 2006 census, its population was 74, in 14 families.

Language 
Linguistic composition of the village.

References 

Populated places in Talesh County

Azerbaijani settlements in Gilan Province